Daniel Sträßer (born 18 July 1987) is a German actor and member of the ensemble of the Burgtheater in Vienna.

Life 
Sträßer already had the chance to be on stage as a student at a Waldorf school. From 2007 he studied acting at the Mozarteum University in Salzburg and graduated in the academic year 2011/2012. During his training he was engaged by Klang 21 for the Pocket Opera Festival Salzburg 2009 in a music theater production (Mahlzeit by Hans-Peter Jahn) directed by Thierry Bruehl. In a university production in 2011, he was discovered by the chief dramaturge of the Burgtheater at the Hamburg Young Talent Competition and made his successful debut there as Romeo.

As part of his studies, he worked in Müller's "Medeamaterial" (director: René Braun), in Trolle's "Hermes in der Stadt" (director: Simon Paul Schneider), in Hage's "De Niros Game" and in Crimp's "Attacks on Anne” (director: Katrin Plötner) and also in 2011 at the Salzburg Festival in A Midsummer Night’s Dream. Sträßer, who names his university mentors Uwe Berend, the former head of drama, and the then guest lecturer (now professor there) Kai Ohrem, has worked on roles from Goethe to Martin Krimp.

In the 2013-14 season he worked in the contemporary witness production The Last Witnesses by Doron Rabinovici and Matthias Hartmann at the Burgtheater in Vienna; the production referred to the Kristallnacht of 1938, was highly appreciated by audiences and the press and was invited to the Berlin Theatertreffen 2014.

In March 2019 it was announced that Sträßer, together with Vladimir Burlakov, would embody the new chief inspectors Adam Schürk and Leo Bäumer in the crime serie Tatort set in Saarland for Saarländischer Rundfunk.

Theater (selection)

Burgtheater Vienna (partly over several seasons) 
 2011/2012: Romeo and Juliet by William Shakespeare (Romeo) – Director: David Bösch
 2011/2012: Wastwater by Simon Stephens (Harry) – directed by Stephan Kimmig
 2011/2012: Die Froschfotzenlederfabrik by Oliver Kluck (colleague, activist, cousin, Gzemek) – director: Anna Bergmann
 2011/2012: A Streetcar Named Desire by Tennessee Williams (A Young Cashier) – Director: Dieter Giesing
 2012/2013: Some Messages to the Universe from Wolfram Lotz (Lum) – Director: Antú Romero Nunes
 2012/2013: Liliom by Franz Molnár (Ficsur) – Director: Barbara Frey
 2013/2014: Hamlet by William Shakespeare (Rosary Beads) – Directed by Andrea Breth
 2013/2014: The Journey to Petushki by Venedikt Erofejew (Wenja) – Director: Felicitas Braun
 2013/2014: A Sorrow Beyond Dreams by Peter Handke (The Son) – Director: Katie Mitchell
 2013/2014: The Seagull by Anton Chekhov (Konstantin Gavrilovich Trepljov) – Director: Jan Bosse

Filmography 
 2014: The Last Dance (Director: Houchang Allahyari)
 2014: Schoenefeld Boulevard
 2015: Polizeiruf 110: Kreise
 2015: Departure
 2015: Alone in Berlin
 2016: A Dangerous Fortune
 2016: 
 2016: Egon Schiele: Death and the Maiden
 2017: Charité
 2020: Exile
 2020: Tatort: Das fleißige Lieschen
 2020: Hausen
 2020: One step too far
 2021: Tatort: Der Herr des Waldes
 2021: A Pure Place
 2022: Tatort: Das Herz der Schlange
 2022: Funeral for a Dog
 2022: Everything is fine

Awards 
 2012: Nestroy Theater Prize – Nominated for Best Young Actor as Romeo in Romeo and Juliet by William Shakespeare
 2014: Nestroy Theater Prize – Nominated for  Best Actor as Konstantin in The Seagull by Anton Chekhov

References

External links 

 Nestroy Der Wiener – Theaterpreis: The nominations 2012
 Nestroy Der Wiener – Theaterpreis: The nominations 2014
 agency profile at the Agentur Players, retrieved on November 11, 2020

1987 births
Living people
People from Völklingen
German actors
German male film actors
German male television actors